Gawain Guy is a Jamaican Olympic middle-distance runner. He represented his country in the men's 1500 meters at the 1984 Summer Olympics. His time was a 3:52.04 in the first heat.

References 

1962 births
Living people
Jamaican male middle-distance runners
Olympic athletes of Jamaica
Athletes (track and field) at the 1984 Summer Olympics